The Taiwan Metal Creation Museum (TMCM) is a sheet metal tourism factory museum in Yongkang District, Tainan, Taiwan.

History
The museum was founded in 2013 by Chih Kang Material Co., Ltd.

Architecture
The museum is divided into several thematic areas, which are culture and creation, education, experience, legacy and tourism.

Transportation
The museum is accessible north east from Yongkang Station of Taiwan Railways.

See also
 List of museums in Taiwan

References

External links
 

2013 establishments in Taiwan
Museums established in 2013
Museums in Tainan
Industry museums in Taiwan
Yongkang District